The Women's Korvpalli Meistriliiga is the top-division Estonian women's basketball league.

Four to six teams normally take part. The first tournament was held in 1991, won by Maynor Meelis from Tallinn. Teams from Tallinn University account for ten of the championship titles. Since the 2012/13 season the top five clubs have been Ekleks (Tallinn), Tallinna Ülikooli (Tallinn), Audentes SG/Noortekoondis (Tallinn), Tartu Ülikooli (Tartu) and AmEst (Rapla). Latvian league teams also compete, including Lat-Est TBR.

History

List of champions

External links
Home page
Profile at eurobasket.com

Estonia
Women's basketball in Estonia
Sports leagues established in 1991
Basketball leagues in Estonia
1991 establishments in Estonia